Dominic Lam Ka-wah (Traditional Chinese:  Simplified Chinese: ; born 2 April 1957) is an Hong Kong Canadian actor and radio personality for Fairchild Radio in Richmond Hill, Canada. His acting career spans four decades, beginning with his television series debut in Crocodile Tears (1978).

Biography

Acting career
Lam was part of the first graduating class of the Royal Hong Kong Police Cadet School in 1974. He then joined the Hong Kong Police Training School and worked as a police officer for five years. He hosted the television program Junior Police Call produced jointly by the Hong Kong Police Force and RTHK. Under the recommendation of producer Johnny Mak, Lam quitted the police to join Rediffusion Television and made his acting debut in Crocodile Tears. In 1980, Lam joined TVB. He made his film debut in the 1981 film No U-turn. Lam played various supporting roles in drama series and hosted several television programs until 1988 when he emigrated to Canada. 

In 2006, Lam returned to Hong Kong and filmed the police drama On the First Beat. He has since starred in several popular television series such as Men Don't Cry (2007), The Money-Maker Recipe (2008), The Four (2008), and E.U. (2009). In 2010, Lam was nominated for Best Supporting Actor at the TVB Anniversary Awards for his performance in A Fistful of Stances. He starred as the antagonist Cheung Gwan in the 2014 crime series The Borderline produced by Hong Kong Television Network. He starred in the 2017 family drama The Tofu War. In 2019, he was cast in the action crime series Flying Tiger 2, playing the role of Au-yeung Ching, a businessman who runs an underground crime syndicate. In 2020, he played the role of Yuen Chun, the father of Madam Yuen in the crime thriller Brutally Young.

Radio show
After his immigration to Toronto in 1988, he began hosting the Cantonese lifestyle radio program "Lam Ka Wah Carnival" on CHKT operated by Fairchild Media. The radio show broadcasts every weekday. He hosted the show remotely when he returned to Hong Kong for filming.

Filmography

TV series

Film
The following is a list of films for Dominic Lam.

 No U-Turn (1981)
 Mr. Mistress (1988)
 Malevolent Mate (1993)
 Unclassified File (1994)
 Century Hero (1999)
 Dog Bite Dog (2006)
 Invisible Target (2007)
 Look for a Star (2009)
 Overheard (2009)
 Team Miracle: We Will Rock You (2009)
 Let's Go! (film) (2011)
 That Demon Within (2014)
 Overheard 3 (2014)
 SPL II: A Time For Consequences (2015)
 Heartfall Arises (2016)
 The Leaker (2018)
 Big Brother (2018)
 Project Gutenberg (2018)
 Distinction (2018)
 Fatal Visit (2019)
 Iron Fist (2019)

Documentary
 Dragon Since 1973 (2002)

References

1957 births
Living people
Hong Kong male television actors
TVB actors
Hong Kong emigrants to Canada
Male actors from Toronto
People from Richmond Hill, Ontario